Shiva Prasad Humagain (9 July 1961) is a Nepalese politician and a leader of Nepali Congress. He was former Central Working Committee Member of Nepali Congress and former Member of Parliament. He served as a Member of Parliament in the Pratinidhi Sabha defeating the then sitting Member of Parliament Keshav Prasad Badal in 1999 election from the Kavre-2 constituency.

Early life
Humagain was born in Kusadevi Village, Panauti to Laxmi Prasad Humagain and Dewa Maya Humagain. He obtained school level education from government School at Kavre.

Political career

 Humagain protested the royal takeover of Feb 1, 2005 and was held in detention for several days by the government of King Gyanendra. The curfew imposed was broken in Bagbazaar, Kathmandu during the  2006 democracy movement (जनआन्दोलन 2062/63 Vikram Samvat) under his leadership. Following the 2006 democracy movement and the reinstatement of the Pratinidhi Sabha, he served as Member of Parliament in the reinstated house and the interim-parliament.

Political Posts

Breakthrough in Central Politics
Humagain is close aide of Krishna Prasad Sitaula and a key member of Nepali Congress 3rd Pole's Policy and Decision Making. In the 13th General convention of the Party held on March 3, 2016, Humagain was among the leader that proposed Krishna Sitaula's candidacy for Party Chairman to fight against Sher Bahadur Deuba. Humagain contested for the post of Central Working Committee Member from Pradesh - 3 from Krishna Prasad Sitaula's Panel. He received 201 votes out of 3,133 votes. Later on Party Chairman Sher Bahadur Deuba nominated Humagain as a Central Working Committee Member of Nepali Congress.

Shortly before four-year term of current office-bearers of the party was to expire, Nepali Congress Chairman Sher Bahadur Deuba appointed Humagain as Chief of Laborer and Trade Union Department of the party as per clause 37(1c).

Comparative table of elections

Electoral history
1999 Pratinidhi Sabha Election Kavre - 2 

Total Voters: 83,364 Votes Cast:60,822 (72.96%) Valid Votes: 59,265 (97.44%)

2008 Constituent Assembly Election Kavre - 3.

2013 Constituent Assembly Election Kavre - 2 

Total Voters: 75,929 Votes Cast: 52,945 (80.76%) Valid Votes: 37,979 (71.73%)

2022 House of Representatives Election Kavre-2 

Total Voters: 1,57,442 Votes Cast: 1,02,723 (65.25%) Valid Votes: 99,225 (96.60%) Invalid Votes: 3,498 (3.60%)

Chart of Humagain's Election Performances over the years

References

External links 
 Shiva Prasad Humagain on Twitter

Living people
1961 births
Nepali Congress politicians from Bagmati Province
People from Kavrepalanchok District
Nepal MPs 1999–2002